= Spike potential =

Spike potentials are one of the action potentials, which occur in electrical activity of smooth muscle contraction in animals.

These are true action potentials.

== Examples ==
In the human gut they occur automatically when the resting membrane potential of the gastrointestinal smooth muscle becomes more positive than about -40 millivolts (the normal resting membrane potential in the smooth muscle fibers of the gut is between -50 and -60 millivolts). The spike potentials last 10 to 40 times as long in gastrointestinal muscle as the action potentials in large nerve fibers, each gastrointestinal spike lasting as long as 10 to 20 milliseconds. Conduction of nerve impulse, depolarization is the first stage of conduction. It occurs when the permeability of the cell membrane to sodium increases past a threshold. In the resting state, the interior of the nerve fiber is negative to the exterior by approximately 70 to 90 millivolts. During cortical reaction in fertilisationof sperm with secondary oocyte spike potential reaches above +30 mv (millivolts). This causes opening of voltage gated Ca2+ channels.
